Rodney Wallace (December 21, 1823 – February 27, 1903) was a U.S. Representative from Massachusetts.

Born in New Ipswich, New Hampshire, Wallace attended the common schools.
He engaged in the manufacture of paper.
He was a member of the Board of Selectmen of Fitchburg, Massachusetts, in 1864, 1865, and 1867.
He served in the Massachusetts House of Representatives in 1873.
He served as member of the Massachusetts Governor's Council from  1880-1882.

Wallace was elected as a Republican to the Fifty-first Congress (March 4, 1889 – March 3, 1891).
Wallace was not a candidate for renomination in 1890 to the Fifty-second Congress.
After serving in congress Wallace returned to the business of manufacturing paper.
He died in Fitchburg, Massachusetts, on February 27, 1903.
He was interred in Laurel Hill Cemetery.

See also
 1873 Massachusetts legislature

References

 Images from: 

1823 births
1903 deaths
People from New Ipswich, New Hampshire
Members of the Massachusetts Governor's Council
Republican Party members of the Massachusetts House of Representatives
Politicians from Fitchburg, Massachusetts
Papermakers
Republican Party members of the United States House of Representatives from Massachusetts
19th-century American politicians